Nathan Hale High School is a public high school in Seattle, Washington, United States, operated by Seattle Public Schools. It was a member of the Coalition of Essential Schools and uses a project-based learning curriculum.

History

The land where Nathan Hale High School is located today was previously occupied by the Fisher Dairy Farm and later the Meadowbrook Golf Course. At that time, Jane Addams was the only secondary school in the area and was part of the Shoreline School District. Nathan Hale High School opened in 1963 with 1,206 students, all sophomores and juniors, and grew to 2,400 students across three grades by the end of the decade. In 1969, unknown individuals painted a Raider on the school's smokestack in the middle of the night. The school radio station, KNHC (for "Nathan Hale Communications"), was founded in 1971. A learning resource center was added in 1972 using bond funds.

The first greenhouse was built in 1973 to house horticulture classes, and carpentry students built a newer solar greenhouse in 1982–83, near a sewer plant that was later redeveloped into Meadowbrook Pond in the late 1990s. Nathan Hale's enrollment dropped dramatically after the district-wide 1978 desegregation plan closed or reassigned many of its feeder schools. The school began admitting ninth graders in 1979. New sports fields were added in 2000 and a new performing arts center was completed in 2005, hosting a free concert by Rihanna a few months later.

Renovations

The original building underwent a major renovation between 2009 and 2011 as part of Bex III, rebuilding 75% of the school and adding a new library and synthetic turf football field. The new building was designed with CES principles in mind and won an AIA National Award in 2014. The old smokestack was demolished during the renovation, but part of it was saved and moved to the south entrance in 2013. In 2015, the old greenhouses were demolished to make way for redevelopment of Thornton Creek, and a new greenhouse was opened behind Jane Addams Middle School in 2016.

Programs and facilities

Ninth grade academies have existed at Nathan Hale for several decades. They organize students into block classes with a reduced student–teacher ratio in health, science, language arts, and social studies. Beginning with the 2018–19 school year, tenth graders take block classes in humanities, art, biology, and career/technical education. Seniors complete a year-long Hale Action Project as a graduation requirement.

Nathan Hale has a 17,000 square foot performing arts center, and its sports facilities include a football field, two gyms, and a weight room. Students use Jane Addams Middle School's soccer field, and swimming classes meet at the Meadowbrook Pool. Nathan Hale has hosted a vocational horticulture program since the 1970s, offering school year and summer classes through Seattle Skills Center.

Student activities

Nathan Hale is home to student-run radio station KNHC. Nathan Hale's journalism class produces the Sentinel, the school newspaper, which won first place with special merit from the National Scholastic Press Association in 1999. Music performance ensembles at Nathan Hale include Jazz band, Vocal Jazz, Concert Orchestra, Chamber Orchestra, Concert Choir and Wind Ensemble The theater department produces an annual fall play and spring musical. Bilingual students belonging to the Hale Ambassadors program attend school events to orient families and provide translation.

Community partnerships

Nathan Hale High School has a Teen Health Center run by Kaiser Permanente that provides free care to students. Nathan Hale also works with neighboring Jane Addams Middle School to improve the transition from middle school to high school for students.

Sports

Nathan Hale is a member of the Washington Interscholastic Activities Association (WIAA). The school has been in the second largest classification, known as 3A,  since the 1984–85 school year. It was previously in the largest classification. The Raiders are a member of the Metro League and Sea-King District.

The school supports 16 WIAA activities, including baseball, boys' and girls' basketball, cheer, cross country, football, golf, gymnastics, boys' and girls' soccer, softball, coed swimming, tennis, track and field, volleyball, and wrestling. Three non-WIAA sanctioned sports are also fielded: boys' lacrosse, girls' lacrosse, and ultimate. The boys' lacrosse team was founded in 1992, making Hale the first public high school in Seattle to have a field lacrosse team.

In 2016, former NBA star Brandon Roy was hired as the head basketball coach, and top recruit Michael Porter Jr., as well as his brothers Jontay and Coban, transferred to the school when their father, Michael Porter Sr., became the assistant coach at the University of Washington. This led to the school becoming nationally relevant, including a national #1 ranking on maxpreps.com. The basketball team completed the 2016–17 season undefeated, defeating Garfield High School 68–51 in the class-3A state championship game in Tacoma, Washington. That season the boys' basketball team traveled to Oregon to play in the Les Schwab Invitational which they won.

The girls' ultimate team were national champions in 2018.

Notable alumni

Athletics
 Lynn Colella - U.S. Olympic swimmer and silver medalist
 Rick Colella - two-time U.S. Olympic swimmer and bronze medalist
 Paul Dade - former Major League Baseball player
 Craig Driver - Current game strategy and catching coach for the Chicago Cubs, former bullpen catcher for the Philadelphia Phillies.
 Rick Fehr - former PGA Tour golfer
 Jordan Malloch - two-time U.S. Olympic sprint canoer
 Michael Porter Jr. - Former Gatorade Player of the Year, First round NBA Draft pick, currently plays for the Denver Nuggets.
 Jontay Porter - former NBA player for the Memphis Grizzlies.
 Bill Roe - former president of USA Track and Field
 Brian Schmetzer - head coach of Seattle Sounders FC
 Ed Simmons - former tackle for Washington Redskins; played 11 seasons, winning two Super Bowls; named one of 70 greatest Redskins of all time
Masai Ujiri - President of Basketball Operations and General Manager of the Toronto Raptors in the National Basketball Association.
Emily Boyd - current goalkeeper for the Chicago Red Stars of the NWSL.

Other
 Luke Burbank - host of the podcast TBTL and radio show Ross & Burbank
 Walt Crowley - local historian and co-creator of the website HistoryLink
 Macklemore - hip-hop artist, real name Ben Haggerty
 Casey Sander - actor, played Wade Swoboda in Grace Under Fire
 Sol - hip-hop artist
 Hari Sreenivasan - PBS NewsHour anchor
 Dan Strauss – city councilmember

References

External links

 
 
 
 KNHC website

High schools in King County, Washington
Seattle Public Schools
Educational institutions established in 1963
Public high schools in Washington (state)
1963 establishments in Washington (state)